Emergency Medical Services in Spain (Servicios de Emergencias Médicas, SEM) (EMS) are public services usually provided by regional Governments.

Organization

Spanish organization for medical emergencies is  a Public Health Integrated EMS (IEMS) that has a network of SAMU/IEMS Medical Emergency Regulation Centers (MERC = SAMU in international appellation). Emergency Primary Care and GP are fully integrated in Spanish IEMS.

Spain has 17 autonomous communities with 17 regional Health Departments. The National Health System is the agglomeration of these 17 Health Departments. So each autonomous community has its own regional IEMS that depend on Regional Health Department. Some EMS have their own staff and vehicles, others outsource the vehicles and staff to private companies. Public EMS departments usually outsource the vehicles and BLS staff. ALS staff are usually government employees.

In addition, some cities have local EMS too (e.g. SAMUR-Madrid).

There are also Emergency Medical Services in some fire departments: cities of Barcelona, Sevilla, Valencia, Zaragoza, Malaga, Bilbao, and Catalonia community. In these EMS, doctors and nurses work with firefighters in advanced life support (ALS) ambulances or helicopters.

Furthermore, non-profit organizations (Spanish Red Cross, DYA) and Civil Defense Groups provide ambulances (usually BLS) with volunteers for some situations (disasters, mass incidents, special events: sports, concerts,...)

Standards

National Minimum Staff Requirements

New legislation was published in June 2012.

Usual types of ambulances and their staff
Spanish EMS is a physician led system with physicians, emergency nurses and technicians in the field. It's a two-tiered response system (Advanced Life Support with physicians and nurses, and Basic Life Support with technicians).

In addition there are fast vehicles (non-ambulance) for emergency interventions:
 RRU (Rapid Response Units / VIR: Vehículo de Intervención Rápida), staffed by a driver/technician and a physician (sometimes an emergency nurse).
 Logistics and communications vehicles for disasters.

Training

Before 2007 there was not a national standard for EMT (TES/Técnico en Emergencias Sanitarias) education, so each region had their own rules (courses from 60 to 600 hours or sometimes only a first aid course; no reciprocity between regions; different terms: TTS-Técnico de Transporte Sanitario, ATTS-Auxiliar de Transporte Sanitario, ATA-Auxiliar de Transporte en Ambulancia, TEM-Técnico en Emergencias Médicas,...). Since 2007 there is a 2 years training occupational course (vocational-Community College)

Telephone number

The emergency dial is 112 (European Emergency Number). in all regions. However, the emergency number for medical services, 061, is available in several regions.

In Spain, the emergency dispatch is a physician regulated system. Each region has its own emergency call center with phone operators (telefonistas), emergency medical dispatchers (gestores de recursos/coordinadores/locutores), medical-regulators (physician) and sometimes nurses.

Curiosities
In Spain, until August, 1st 2018, the law (motor vehicle code) only allowed the police vehicles to use blue lights. Ambulances and fire engines had to use amber lights. However some ambulances used red/amber, white/amber, blue/amber, blue/red lights although this was illegal. Since that date, all emergency vehicles (police cars, ambulances, RRU, fire trucks,...) have to use blue lights. Vehicles that had amber lights have to change them within a maximum time period of two years. .

See also
Spanish National Health System

Sources

External links
 SAMU 061 de Baleares 
 061 Aragón
 061 Cantabria
 061 Galicia
 061 Murcia
 EPES 061
 SAMUR
 SEM sem.gencat.cat/ : (en:), (es:), (ca:) langs.
 SUMMA 112

Spain
Medical and health organisations based in Spain
Emergency services in Spain